is a national university in Yamaguchi Prefecture, Japan. It has campuses at the cities of Yamaguchi and Ube.

History 
In 1863 the school became a han school of Chōshū Domain and was renamed Yamaguchi Meirinkan.

After the Meiji Restoration it became a prefectural secondary school, and in 1894 it developed into , a national institute of higher education. It served as a preparatory course for the Imperial University. In February 1905 the school was reorganized into , the third national commercial college in Japan, after Tokyo (1887) and Kobe (1902). In 1944 the school was renamed Yamaguchi College of Economics.

In 1949 Yamaguchi University was established by integrating six public (national and prefectural) schools in Yamaguchi Prefecture, namely, (Revived) Yamaguchi Higher School, Yamaguchi College of Economics, Ube Technical College, Yamaguchi Normal School, Yamaguchi Youth Normal School and (Prefectural) Yamaguchi College of Veterinary Medicine and Animal Husbandry.

In 1964 Yamaguchi Prefectural Medical College was merged into the university to constitute the School of Medicine. In 1966 Yoshida Campus (the main campus) was opened, and the faculties (except Engineering and Medicine) moved to the campus in the following years.

Undergraduate schools 
Yoshida Campus (in Yamaguchi)
 Faculty of Humanities
 Faculty of Education
 Faculty of Economics
 Faculty of Science
 Faculty of Agriculture
Kogushi Campus (in Ube)
 School of Medicine
Tokiwa Campus (in Ube)
 Faculty of Engineering

Graduate schools 
 Graduate School of Humanities (Master's courses only)
 Graduate School of Education (Master's courses only)
 Graduate School of Economics (Master's courses only)
 Graduate School of Medicine
 Graduate School of Science and Engineering
 Graduate School of Agriculture (Master's courses only)
 Graduate School of East Asian Studies (Doctoral courses only)
 Graduate School of Innovation and Technology Management (professional courses)
 United Graduate School of Veterinary Science, Yamaguchi University (Doctoral courses only)
 United Graduate School of Agricultural Science, Tottori University (Doctoral courses only)

Alumni 
 Maryam Matar (born 1975), Emirati geneticist and medical researcher
 Daishiro Yamagiwa (born 1968), Japanese politician

References

External links 
 

Educational institutions established in 1894
Japanese national universities
Universities and colleges in Yamaguchi Prefecture
1894 establishments in Japan